Bloviation is a style of empty, pompous, political speech that originated in Ohio and was used by US President Warren G. Harding, who described it as "the art of speaking for as long as the occasion warrants, and saying nothing".  His opponent, William Gibbs McAdoo, compared it to "an army of pompous phrases moving over the landscape in search of an idea."

Origin
Bloviation in Ohio was originally idle chatter.  As a form of political speech, it appears in the Debates and Proceedings of the Convention for the Revision of the State of Ohio in the mid 19th century.  One etymology suggests that the word is a "compound of blow, in its sense of 'to boast' (also in another typical Americanism, blowhard), with a mock-Latin ending to give it the self-important stature implicit in its meaning."

Gamalielese
H. L. Mencken lampooned Harding's bloviate style as gamalielese, from his middle name of Gamaliel.  He complained that the style was suited to Ohio yokels: 

In this he was responding to The New York Times which had defended Harding's style as presidential:

See also
 Circumlocution
 Filibuster
 Stilted speech
 Verbiage

References

Public speaking
Rhetoric
Warren G. Harding